Alpheus Baker (May 28, 1828 – October 21, 1891) was a brigadier general in the Confederate States Army during the American Civil War.

Biography
Born in South Carolina, Baker was a schoolteacher and practiced law before moving to Alabama. Upon Alabama's secession from the Union, Baker enlisted as a captain in the Eufaula Rifles before being transferred to the 1st Alabama Infantry, where he was briefly stationed in Pensacola, Florida, before being sent to Tennessee in late 1861.

Being elected colonel by a mixed regiment of soldiers from Alabama, Mississippi, and Tennessee in 1862, his unit fought in the Battle of New Madrid, where he was subsequently taken prisoner. Released in a prisoner exchange within several months, Baker was given command of the 54th Alabama Infantry, which he would lead during the battles of Vicksburg and Champion's Hill, where he was seriously wounded. After his recovery, Baker assumed command of an Alabama brigade and promoted to brigadier general on March 5, 1864. Later participating in the Atlanta Campaign, he was again wounded at the Battle of Ezra Church. Reassigned to the Department of the Gulf, Baker led his brigade in the defenses of Mobile but rejoined the Army of Tennessee for the Carolinas Campaign in 1865.

According to his last wishes, Baker was buried among his soldiers at Cave Hill Cemetery in Louisville, Kentucky, upon his death. An empty space was reserved in his honor among the burials of Confederate prisoners-of-war who were held in the Louisville Prison Camp.

See also

List of American Civil War Generals (Confederate)

Notes

References
 Current, Richard N., ed., The Confederacy. New York: Simon and Schuster Macmillan, 1993. . Macmillan Compendium. Sections from the four-volume Macmillan Encyclopedia of the Confederacy.
 Eicher, John H., and David J. Eicher, Civil War High Commands. Stanford: Stanford University Press, 2001. .
 Faust, Patricia L., ed. Historical Times Illustrated History of the Civil War. New York: Harper & Row, 1986. . Articles cited > In Historical Times Illustrated History of the Civil War, edited by Patricia L. Faust. New York: Harper & Row, 1986. . 
 Linedecker, Clifford L., ed., Civil War, A-Z: The Complete Handbook of America's Bloodiest Conflict. New York: Ballantine Books, 2002. 
 Sifakis, Stewart. Who Was Who in the Civil War. New York: Facts On File, 1988. .
 Warner, Ezra J. Generals in Gray: Lives of the Confederate Commanders. Baton Rouge: Louisiana State University Press, 1959. .

1828 births
1898 deaths
Confederate States Army brigadier generals
People of Alabama in the American Civil War
People from South Carolina
American Civil War prisoners of war
Burials at Cave Hill Cemetery